The 2015–16 Munster Rugby season was Munster's fifteenth season competing in the Pro12 alongside which they also competed in the European Rugby Champions Cup. It was Anthony Foley's second season as head coach.

Events
Munster opened their pre-season with a 29–38 defeat to Grenoble in a friendly at Thomond Park on 14 August.	
A week later on 21 August, Munster suffered a 28–12 defeat to Connacht in their second pre-season friendly at Thomond Park.
On 28 August, Munster defeated London Irish 21–15 at Irish Independent Park in their final warm-up match for the new season.	
	
The new Pro12 season was launched in London on 24 August. Munster began the new season with an 18–13 win against Benetton Treviso in Cork on 5 September.
Munster were captained by CJ Stander in the opening match, where he also scored two second-half tries and earned the Man-of-the-Match award.

In January, Andy Farrell joined the province in an advisory role on a part-time basis over four months before taking up his four-year contract with Ireland in the summer

On 25 March, Simon Zebo scored two tries against Zebre to bring his total to 43 tries in 97 provincial appearances.	
In doing so, he overtook Anthony Horgan's try-scoring record of 41 for Munster.

On 24 April, it was announced that Johan Erasmus will join Munster as the newly created Director of Rugby role in a three-year deal beginning on July 1.
	
On 7 May, Munster secured their place in 2016-17 Champions Cup after a 31–15 victory over the Scarlets at Thomond Park earned them a sixth-place finish in the Pro12.

On 2 June, Munster Rugby announced a forecasted deficit of €1.9 million for the year ending 30 June 2016 at their Annual General Meeting in Limerick.

Coaching and management staff 2015–16

Senior Playing Squad 2015–16

 Internationally capped players in bold.
 Players qualified to play for Ireland on residency or dual nationality. *
 Irish provinces are currently limited to 4 non-Irish eligible (NIE) players and 1 non-Irish qualified player (NIQ or "Project Player").

2015–16 Pro12
The new Pro12 season began on 5 September.

2015–16 European Rugby Champions Cup
The draw for the 2015-16 European Rugby Champions Cup was held on 17 June. Munster will face Stade Francais, Leicester Tigers and Benetton Treviso.
Munster opened their campaign on 14 November against Benetton Treviso at Thomond Park and won the game on a 32-7 scoreline with a bonus point secured after a late try by Simon Zebo in a match played in wet and windy conditions.
On 17 November, Stade Français postponed their Champions Cup clash with Munster on the 22 November in the wake of the Paris attacks.	
On 12 December, Munster lost to Leicester Tigers at Thomond Park by 31–19.
On 9 January, Munster were eliminated from the European Rugby Champions Cup after a 27–7 defeat to Stade Français in Stade Jean-Bouin in Paris. Stade Francais played 40 minutes of the game with 14 men after Josaia Raisuqe's received a red card but outscored their Munster 17-7 during that period.
A week later on 16 January, Munster defeated Stade Français at Thomond Park 26-13 to avoid a fourth straight defeat in the competition.	
Munster finished their European Champions Cup campaign with a bonus-point triumph away to Treviso on 24 January.

References

External links
2015–16 Munster Rugby season at official site
2015–16 Munster Rugby season at Pro12

2015-16
2015–16 Pro12 by team
2015–16 in Irish rugby union
2015–16 European Rugby Champions Cup by team